Imtiaz or Imtiyaz is a given name of Arabic origin, which means "distinct" or "unique". It may refer to:
Imtiaz Abbasi (born 1968), Emirati cricketer
Imtiyaz Ahmed (born 1985), Indian cricketer 
Imtiaz Alam Hanfi (1929–2015), Pakistani banker 
Imtiaz Ali (cricketer) (born 1954), Trinidad cricketer
Imtiaz Ali (director) (born 1971), Indian film director
Imtiyaz Ali Khan (born 1926), Indian painter and art historian
Imtiaz Ali Taj (1900–1970), Pakistani writer
Imtiaz Bhatti (born 1933), Pakistani air commodore and diplomat
Imtiaz Dharker (born 1954), British poet and filmmaker
Imtiaz Gilani (born 1947), Pakistani civil engineer
Imtiaz Hossain (born 1985), Bangladeshi cricketer
Imtiaz Safdar Warraich (born 1952), Pakistani politician
Imtiaz Hussain (born 1989), Pakistani Banker
Imtiaz Ali Chachar (born 1985),
Pakistani Social worker 
/Govt officer  

Arabic masculine given names